The Dream Merchant Vol. 2 is the second compilation album from producer 9th Wonder, formerly of Little Brother. It was released on October 9, 2007 through Sixhole Records. The album has guest appearances by his former group, Little Brother, his fellow Justus League members, Sean Price, Big Dho, L.E.G.A.C.Y., Chaundon, Skyzoo, Keisha Shontelle, Big Treal, The A.L.L.I.E.S., Jozeemo, Tyler Woods, Joe Scudda, Buckshot, Sean Boog, D.O.X., O-Dash, Buddy Klein & Median, also outside performers (including some who 9th worked with) including Torae, Mos Def, Memphis Bleek, Jean Grae, Royce Da 5'9, Vandalyzm, Naledge (½ of Kidz in the Hall), Saigon, Camp Lo, Ness (of Da Band), Strange Fruit Project & Natural Born Spittas. The album also marks the debut of then-unknown MC, Rapsody.

Track listing
Mr. Dream Merchant (Intro)
Shots (featuring Sean Price & Big Dho)
Merchants Of Dreams (featuring L.E.G.A.C.Y., Chaundon, Skyzoo, and Torae)
Brooklyn In My Mind (Crooklyn Dodgers III) (featuring Mos Def, Memphis Bleek & Jean Grae)
Sunday (featuring Keisha Shontelle & Chaundon)
Baking Soda (featuring Big Treal)
Reminisce (featuring Novej & Big Remo The Great)
No Time To Chill (featuring Little Brother)
It Ain't Over (featuring Jozeemo & Tyler Woods)
The Last Time (featuring Naledge of Kidz in the Hall, Royce da 5'9" & Vandalyzm)
Saved (featuring Saigon & Joe Scudda)
The Milky Lowa (featuring Camp Lo)
Backlash (featuring Buckshot & Sean Boog)
Thank You (featuring D.O.X. & O-Dash)
Let It Bang (featuring Ness & Skyzoo)
What Makes a Man (featuring Buddy Klein & Rapper Big Pooh)
Special Remix (featuring Strange Fruit Project & Median) (bonus track)
You Wanna (featuring NBS) (bonus track)

Samples
"Mr. Dream Merchant (Intro)" contains samples from: "I'm Dreamin'" by Christopher Williams, "Juicy" by The Notorious B.I.G. with Total, "These Dreams" by Heart, "Dreams" by The Game and "Mr. Dream Merchant" by Jerry Butler.
"Shots" contains samples from: "Turn Off the Lights" by Teddy Pendergrass and "And I Love Her" by Bobby Womack.
"Merchants Of Dreams" contains samples from: "Love at First Sight" by The Stylistics, "Microphone Fiend" by Eric B. & Rakim and "Crooklyn" by The Crooklyn Dodgers.
"Brooklyn In My Mind" contains samples from: "Love To Keep You In My Mind" by Curtis Mayfield, "Go Stetsa I" by Stetsasonic, "Juicy" by The Notorious B.I.G. with Total and "Crooklyn" by The Crooklyn Dodgers.
"Sunday" contains samples from: "Back in the Day" by Ahmad and "Wings of My Love" by Michael Jackson.
"Baking Soda" contains a sample of "What the World Knows" by Gene Page.
"Reminisce" contains samples from: "Walkin' in the Rain with the One I Love" by Danny Pearson and "Whatever Goes Around" by Jerry Butler.
"It Ain't Over" contains a sample of "Pardon Me" by Thelma Houston.
"The Last Time" contains a sample of "The Weight" by Diana Ross & The Supremes with The Temptations.
"Saved" contains samples from: "Can We Come and Share In Love" by Joe Simon and "Murder Was the Case" by Snoop Dogg and Daz Dillinger.
"The Milky Lowa" contains samples from: "Together We Can Make Such Sweet Music" by The Spinners and "Rainbow on the Ground" by Creative Source.
"Backlash" contains a sample of "Feet Don't Fail Me Now" by Denise LaSalle.
"Thank You" contains a sample of "Thank You for the Moment" by Billy Eckstine.
"Let It Bang" contains a sample of "I Intend to Take Your Place" by Bobby Bland.
"What Makes a Man" contains a sample of "Woman" by James Brown.
"Special Remix" is a remix of "Special" by Strange Fruit Project and Thesis
"Special Remix" also contains samples from: "Touch" by The Jackson 5 and "Change the Beat (Female Version)" by Beside.

Personnel
 Scratches - DJ Premier (4)
 Background Vocals [Additional] - Darien Brockington (4)
 A&R – 9th Wonder, Big Dho
 Art Direction, Design – Christopher Gregory
 Executive-Producer – Mischa "Big Dho" Burgess, Patrick "9th Wonder" Douthit*
 Management – Big Dho
 Mastered By – Square "SQ"
 Mixed By – 9th Wonder
 Mixed By [Additional] – Big Dho
 Photography By – Tobias Rose

References

External links
 Dream Merchant 2 Album Snippets

2007 albums
9th Wonder albums
Albums produced by 9th Wonder